Saraḱino is a village in the municipality of Tetovo, North Macedonia.

Demographics
According to the 2021 census, the village had a total of 1.153 inhabitants. Ethnic groups in the village include:

Macedonians 791
Albanians 277
Romani 8
Serbs 2 
Others 72

References

External links

Villages in Tetovo Municipality
Albanian communities in North Macedonia